Craniotome  is a genus of plants in the mint family (Lamiaceae), first described in 1825. It contains only one known species, Craniotome furcata, native to Sichuan, Tibet, Yunnan, Sikkim, Bhutan, Himalayas of northern + eastern India, Laos, Myanmar, Nepal, and Vietnam.

References

Lamiaceae
Flora of Asia
Plants described in 1822